Penmetsa Vishnu Kumar Raju (age: 52) is a member of the Bharatiya Janata Party and has won the Andhra Pradesh Legislative Assembly election, 2014 from Visakhapatnam North, Andhra Pradesh. Penmetsa Vishnu Kumar Raju was actually from Kapavaram Village in W.G. Dist. His family migrated to Visakhapatnam in the 1970s. Vishnu was a state ranker in his school at VT College, Vizag and Topper in Civil Engineering from Andhra University and a Gold Medalist from Andhra University.

He won with 82,079 votes in Assembly Election, Visakhapatnam District, Andhra Pradesh by a margin of 18,240 compared to his political rival Chokkakula Venkata Rao of YSRCP.

References

Living people
Politicians from Visakhapatnam
Bharatiya Janata Party politicians from Andhra Pradesh
Andhra Pradesh MLAs 2014–2019
Year of birth missing (living people)